41 Capricorni is a binary star system in the southern constellation of Capricornus. It is faintly visible to the naked eye with an apparent visual magnitude of +5.24. It is moving closer with a heliocentric radial velocity of −45 km/s.

This is a yellow K-type giant star with a stellar classification of K0 III. At the age of around 550 million years it has become a red clump star, which indicates it is generating energy via helium fusion at its core.

References

K-type giants
Horizontal-branch stars
Binary stars
Capricornus (constellation)
Durchmusterung objects
Capricorni, 41
206356
107128
8285